The eighteenth European Masters Athletics Championships were held in Zittau, Germany, Zgorzelec, Poland and Hrádek nad Nisou, Czech Republic, from August 16–25, 2012. The European Masters Athletics Championships serve the division of the sport of athletics for people over 35 years of age, referred to as masters athletics.

The championships were held in three locations near the German/Czech/Polish border.

Less countries participated compared with the last championships in Nyiregyhaza, but just over 700 more athletes participated, giving it the third greatest attendance of any championship run by European Masters Athletics ever.

Results

Men

M35

M40

M45

M50

M55

M60

M65

M70

M75

M80

M85

M90

Women

W35

W40

W45

W50

W55

W60

W65

W70

W75

W80

W85

W90

References 

 
European Masters Athletics Championships
European Masters